'The Chicago Underground Film Festival (CUFF) is an annual international festival dedicated to the exhibition of underground and avant-garde cinema, video, and performance. It was founded in 1993 by Jay Bliznick and Bryan Wendorf as an alternative to the mainstream film festival circuit, which was increasingly dominated by distributor product."

History
The festival was founded in 1993 by Jay Bliznick with Mark Siska and Bryan Wendorf as an alternative to the mainstream film festival circuit, which was increasingly dominated by distributor product. The festival's stated goal is "to focus on the artistic, aesthetic, and fun side of independent filmmaking." CUFF promotes works that dissent radically in form, content, and technique from both the tired conventions of Hollywood and the increasingly stagnant IndieWood mainstream.

Purpose
While the festival has always explored the many different definitions of underground film, in its early years the festival's programming consisted mainly of low-budget b-movies and films in the tradition of the Cinema of Transgression but more recently moved its to focus more toward experimental and avant-garde films and videos and documentaries.
The festival programming is diverse and varied and the festival's objective is to showcase the defiantly independent filmmaker by promoting film and video that challenges and transcends expectations. CUFF welcomes a mix of films and videos of all lengths and genres, but the festival’s dominant focus is on works that chart new, experimental ground in form or content. The festival has an excellent reputation for curation and has become known for being one of the key events in the history of the underground. In February 2008 it was announced that the festival has become an official program of IFP/Chicago Independent Feature Project. From 2009 to 2010, the festival Was held at the Gene Siskel Film Center, a state of the art cinematheque connected to the School of the Art Institute of Chicago since 2011 the festival has been held at the Logan Theatre in Chicago, a popular independent movie theater on city's North side. The festival runs over the course of several days, featuring an extensive lineup of films, videos, and performances, as well as parties and concerts.

Awards 
 The festival jury presents several awards to films and videos selected as the best or most interesting in various categories. The festival has also presented "Made in Chicago" awards, which recognize films and videos made by local filmmakers, and Audience Choice awards. The festival has also featured retrospectives of legendary underground filmmakers such as John Waters, Kenneth Anger, and Alejandro Jodorowsky. The festival's mission is to showcase the work of film and video makers with unique and independent visions, and to promote film and video that challenges and transcends expectations. CUFF's programming is a mix of documentary, experimental and avant-garde narrative films and videos, highlighting new forms of media art and fostering an audience for this type of work by creating an accessible and enjoyable event. The festival's website is www.cuff.org

Notable films

2011
The Color Wheel - Directed by Alex Ross Perry
Profane - Directed by Usama Alshaibi
Battle for Brooklyn - Directed by Michael Galinsky and Suki Hawley

References

External links
 Official website

Experimental film festivals
Film festivals in Chicago
Underground film festivals